Farlowella henriquei is a species of armored catfish endemic to Brazil where it occurs in the Araguaia River basin.  This species grows to a length of  SL.

References 
 

henriquei
Fish of South America
Fish of Brazil
Endemic fauna of Brazil
Fish described in 1918